The Peruvian Armed Forces are the military services of Peru, comprising independent Army, Navy and Air Force components. Their primary mission is to safeguard the country's independence, sovereignty and territorial integrity against any threat. As a secondary mission they participate in economic and social development as well as in civil defense tasks.

The National Police of Peru is often classified as a part of the armed forces. Although in fact it has a different organisation and a wholly civil mission, its training and activities over more than two decades as an anti-terrorist force have produced markedly military characteristics, giving it the appearance of a virtual fourth military service with significant land, sea and air capabilities and approximately 140,000 personnel. The Peruvian armed forces report through the Ministry of Defense, while the National Police of Peru report through the Ministry of Interior.

Joint Command

The Joint Command of the Armed Forces is tasked with the mission to "plan, prepare, coordinate and conduct military operations and actions to guarantee independence, sovereignty and territorial integrity and support the national development of Peru". This branch of the armed forces was developed in the 1950s following World War II, when Peru evaluated operational tactics used and adapted them to their own military. On 1 February 1957, the Joint Command was created following a commission of defense agencies studied its role, with the Joint Command depending directly on the President of Peru while also being "the highest step in the planning and coordination of the operations of the Army, Navy and Aeronautics Forces".

Army

Headquartered in Lima, it has a strength of 90,000 troops divided in four military regions with headquarters in Piura, Lima, Arequipa and Iquitos. Every military region is assigned several brigades of which there are different types, including infantry, cavalry and armored. There are also several groups and battalions which operate independently of the army's organization.

The equipment of the Peruvian Army includes infantry weapons that include assault rifles and carbines such as the M16A2 and the M4A1 and pistols like the FN Five-seveN and Smith & Wesson M&P9.

Vehicles include several types of tanks (T-55 and AMX-13), armoured personnel carriers (M-113, UR-416), artillery (D30, M101, M109 and M114 howitzers), antiaircraft systems (ZSU-23-4 Shilka) and helicopters (Mil Mi-2, Mil Mi-17). Recently, Peru has sought to update their collection of tanks and armored personnel carriers that have not been updated since acquiring vehicles from the Soviet Union. After an initial deal with China fell through, Peru has attempted to make a deal with General Dynamics to purchase new military vehicles.

Navy

The Peruvian Navy (Marina de Guerra del Perú) is organized in five naval zones headquartered in Piura, Lima, Arequipa, Iquitos and Pucallpa. It has a strength of around 25,988 troops divided between the Pacific Operations and the Amazon Operations General Commands and the Coast Guard.

The Pacific fleet flagship is the guided-missile cruiser BAP Almirante Grau (FM-53), named for the 19th-century Peruvian Admiral who fought in the War of the Pacific (1879–1883). The fleet also includes 7 Lupo class frigates (two built in Peru), 6 PR-72P class corvettes, 2 Pohang-class corvettes, several amphibious ships, 2 Type 209/1100 and 4 Type 209/1200 class German-built diesel submarines (the biggest submarine force in South America), as well as patrol vessels, tankers and cargo ships. The Peruvian Navy also has a naval aviation force, several naval infantry battalions and special forces units.

Marines

The Peruvian Marines date back to 6 November 1821, when the Peruvian Navy requested a battalion of soldiers. Its first battle was an attack on the Spanish, successfully taking the city of Arica (today Tacna). Into the mid-20th century, the Peruvian Marines modernized their equipment and by the 1980s with the Shining Path emerging as a new threat to Peru, the Marines began to be tasked with counterterrorism operations.

As part of the Peruvian Navy, the Peruvian Marines utilize the equipment and logistics of the Navy. Various Marine battalions are based in Ancón, Iquitos, Mollendo, Pucallpa, Puno and Tumbes. The Peruvian Marines also have a Special Forces composed of the Espíritus Negros and Fuerza Delta, based on the American Delta Force and US Army Rangers.

Air Force

 

On May 20, 1929, the aviation divisions of the Peruvian army and navy were merged into the Peruvian Aviation Corps (CAP, Cuerpo de Aviación del Peru). In 1950, the corps was reorganized again and became the Peruvian Air Force (FAP, Fuerza Aérea del Perú). 

The Peruvian Air Force is divided into six wing areas, headquartered in Piura, Chiclayo, Lima, Arequipa, Rioja and Iquitos. With a strength of 17,969 troops, the FAP counts in its arsenal with MiG-29 (interceptor) and Mirage 2000 (interdictor / multirole aircraft).

It also has Su-25 close-support aircraft, Mi-25 attack helicopters, Mi-17 transport helicopters, Aermacchi MB-339, Embraer EMB-312 Tucano subsonic training aircraft, and the Cessna A-37B for light attack and COIN missions.

In 1995, the FAP took part in the Cenepa War against Ecuador covering operations by the army and navy. After the war, the FAP began acquiring new aircraft, especially MiG-29 fighters and Su-25 close air support aircraft which are, along with the Mirage 2000 fighters, the main combat elements of the FAP.

References

External links

Peruvian Ministry of Defence 
Official Peruvian Army website 
Official Peruvian Air Force website 
Official Peruvian Navy website